Roman Mykolayovych Bodnar (born 1 February 1974) is a Ukrainian civil servant and politician. He is a former Governor of Cherkasy Oblast.

Biography 
He studied at the Odessa Agricultural Institute (1991–1996).

Bodnar is a mechanical engineer by profession.

From 1997 to 1998, he served in the Armed Forces of Ukraine.

He headed the company Promtehproekt in Chernivtsi.

From 2014 to 2019, Bodnar worked at the Security Service.

References

External links 
 

1974 births
Living people
People from Vinnytsia Oblast
Security Service of Ukraine officers
Ukrainian civil servants
Governors of Cherkasy Oblast
21st-century Ukrainian politicians
Independent politicians in Ukraine